Abdoulaye Cissé (born 24 December 1983) is a former professional footballer who played as a striker. Born in Ivory Coast, he represented Burkina Faso at international level.

Club career
Cissé was born in Adzopé, Ivory Coast.

He moved to Al-Siliya Sports Club from Al Faisaly, following a loan to Al-Khor Sports Club during the 2006–07 season. He moved to Egyptian League giants Zamalek SC on 15 May 2012, from Al-Masry. He joined Al-Ittihad (Tripoli) in 2013 for one season, and returned to Zamalek SC in 2014 summer transfer window.

International career
Cissé was a member of the Burkinabé 2004 African Nations Cup team, who finished bottom of their group in the first round of competition, thus failing to secure qualification for the quarter-finals.

Honours
Zamalek
Egyptian Premier League: 2014–15

References
Infobox statistics
 Montpellier: 
 Al-Faisaly, Al-Khor (both spells), Al-Siliya, Al-Dhafra, Burkina Faso: 
 Al-Masry, Zamalek: 
Specific

External links
 
 
 

1983 births
Living people
People from Adzopé
Citizens of Burkina Faso through descent
Ivorian people of Burkinabé descent
Sportspeople of Burkinabé descent
Burkinabé footballers
Association football forwards
Burkina Faso international footballers
Ligue 1 players
Montpellier HSC players
Ligue 2 players
Al Masry SC players
Al-Khor SC players
Al-Sailiya SC players
Al Dhafra FC players
Al-Ittihad Club (Tripoli) players
Zamalek SC players
Al-Faisaly FC players
Egyptian Premier League players
Saudi Professional League players
Qatar Stars League players
UAE Pro League players
Libyan Premier League players
2004 African Cup of Nations players
Burkinabé expatriate footballers
Expatriate footballers in France
Burkinabé expatriate sportspeople in France
Expatriate footballers in Qatar
Burkinabé expatriate sportspeople in Qatar
Expatriate footballers in Egypt
21st-century Burkinabé people